"Bitch" (also known by its censored title "Nothing In Between" and later as "Bitch (Nothing In Between)") is a song by American singer-songwriter Meredith Brooks and co-written with Shelly Peiken. The song was released to American radio in March 1997 as the lead single from Brooks' second album, Blurring the Edges (1997), and was issued as a commercial single on May 20, 1997. The song was produced by punk notable Geza X.

In the United States, the song steadily rose on the Billboard Hot 100, eventually peaking at number two for four weeks. The song also peaked at number two in Australia and Canada and reached number six in the United Kingdom. In Australasia, at the APRA Music Awards of 1998, it won the award for Most Performed Foreign Work. The song ranked at number 79 on VH1's "100 Greatest Songs of the '90s", and was nominated for Best Female Rock Vocal Performance and Best Rock Song at the 40th Annual Grammy Awards.

Writing and inspiration

"Bitch" was written by Brooks and Shelly Peiken. The song originated from feelings of frustration that Peiken felt in regards to her stalling music career. These feelings of frustration inspired the song's opening lyrics—"I hate the world today"—which resulted in Peiken conceptualizing a song titled "Bitch". Peiken reached out to Brooks to collaborate on the song, commenting: "[Brooks] had a lot of spunk, and I knew she could relate to this idea." Brooks claimed that she was additionally inspired to write the song after reading the writings of psychiatrist Carl Jung. The song was written in a single day in a spare bedroom of Peiken's home in Laurel Canyon, Los Angeles. In an interview with Billboard, Brooks described the song as being about self-acceptance, referring to the word "bitch" as a term of endearment. Brooks intended to reclaim the word, removing the pejorative connotations surrounding it. She further explained the meaning of the song:
I'm not "an angry young girl" - or whatever the phrase of the moment is - but I'm human. It's not to excuse ranting and raving, but I don't think there's anything wrong with having "a mood". I don't think we all need to keep the mask on all the time.
Capitol Records was initially hesitant to release "Bitch" as the lead single from Blurring the Edges (1997) due to the song's explicit lyrical content. The label's vice president of artists and repertoire, Perry Watts-Russell, and producer Geza X both expressed their concerns about the song's lyrics potentially having a negative impact on its commercial performance. Peiken explained that the record label considered censoring the song, although she and Brooks convinced the label to release the song to airplay with the lyrics intact. Following the release and subsequent success of the song, Brooks commented that she believed "Bitch" achieved its intended purpose of being a "celebration of Everywoman's multiple psyches."

Composition
According to the sheet music published at Musicnotes.com by Alfred Publishing, the song is written in the key of A major and is set in time signature of common time with a tempo of 92 beats per minute. Brooks' vocal range spans two octaves, from E3 to C5.

Critical reception
Stephen Thomas Erlewine of AllMusic cited "Bitch" as an "Alanis clone", critiquing the "semi-profane lyrics to the caterwauling chorus". Other music critics similarly compared the song to that of singer-songwriter Alanis Morissette, with Billboard, Entertainment Weekly, and the Los Angeles Times all making note of the musical similarities between Morissette's work at the time in comparison with "Bitch". Record producer Geza X deliberately sought a hit single that sounded like Morissette's songs, yet he was fired soon afterward even when "Bitch" achieved major success, due to conflicts with Brooks' record label. David Fricke from Rolling Stone remarked its "the notice-me snap".

Chart performance
In the United States, "Bitch" debuted at number 57 on the Billboard Hot 100 chart for the issue dated April 26, 1997. The song spent a total of 35 weeks on the chart, peaking at number two for the issue dated July 12, 1997.

Music video
The accompanying music video for "Bitch" was directed by Paul Andressen in Los Angeles, California. The video features Brooks on guitar while performing the song on a shimmering floral background. Throughout the course of the song, several objects typically associated with women are shown floating around the singer.

Live performances
The song was performed as part of Brooks' opening set on the Rolling Stones' Bridges to Babylon Tour. Brooks left the stage early after the audience began booing and throwing bottles, batteries, and coins at her. In response, Brooks cited the crowd's behavior as misogynistic and illustrative of the dangers of mob mentality.

Track listings and formats

 US CD single and cassette
 "Bitch"  – 4:13
 "Down by the River"  – 4:15

 US maxi-CD single
 "Bitch" (album version) – 4:13
 "Bitch" (untied) – 3:56
 "Bitch" (Transistor mix) – 4:07
 "Bitch" (Tee's In-House mix) – 6:13
 "Down by the River"  – 4:15

 UK CD and Australian maxi-CD single
 "Bitch" (edit) – 3:58
 "Bitch" (Transistor mix) – 4:07
 "Bitch" (Madgroove mix) – 3:45
 "Bitch" (E-Team Funky Bitch edit) – 3:05

 UK 7-inch vinyl
 "Bitch" (edit) – 3:58
 "Bitch" (Madgroove mix) – 3:45

 European and French CD single
 "Bitch" (edit) – 4:12
 "Bitch" (Transistor mix) – 4:07

 European maxi-CD single
 "Bitch" (edit) – 3:58
 "Bitch" (untied version) – 3:56
 "Bitch" (Todd Terry's Inhouse mix) – 6:13
 "Down by the River"  – 4:15

 Japanese CD single
 "Bitch"  – 4:13
 "Down by the River"  – 4:14
 "Bitch" (Transistor mix) – 4:07

Credits and personnel
Credits and personnel are adapted from Blurring the Edges album booklet.

Studios
 Recorded at City Lab Sound Design (Hollywood, California)
 Mixed at Sunset Sound Factory (Hollywood, California)
 Mastered at Gateway Mastering (Portland, Maine, US)

Personnel

 Meredith Brooks – vocals, background vocals, guitars
 Paul Bushnell – bass
 David Ricketts – keyboards
 Josh Freese – drums
 Geza X – drum loop programming, production, engineering
 Jim Ebert – mixing, engineering
 Bob Ludwig – mastering

Charts

Weekly charts

Year-end charts

Certifications and sales

Release history

Covers and parodies

In 2000, Australian comedian Chris Franklin released a parody of the song titled "Bloke" with the lyrics changed to reflect the stereotypical Australian male lifestyle. The song peaked at number one on the Australian ARIA Singles Chart.

American comedy music group Raymond and Scum parodied the song as "Blair Witch", a parody about the film The Blair Witch Project (1999). Kim Gordon of the band Sonic Youth has stated that their song "Female Mechanic Now on Duty" was inspired by "Bitch". "It's worth mentioning," says Kim, "that the song, 'Female Mechanic on Duty' was inspired by 'Bitch' by that famous Lilith-type female singer, Meredith Brooks. It's an answer song." In 2016, Britney Spears gave a spoken word performance of the song during her Britney: Piece of Me concert residency.

See also
 List of Billboard Mainstream Top 40 number-one songs of the 1990s

References

Meredith Brooks songs
1996 songs
1997 debut singles
APRA Award winners
Capitol Records singles
List songs
Song recordings produced by Geza X
Songs with feminist themes
Songs written by Meredith Brooks
Songs written by Shelly Peiken